Betty Ann Bruno (born May 4, 1930) is an American reporter and television host who worked for KTVU-Channel 2 in San Francisco for over 20 years, until her retirement in 1992. She was born in Hawaii, but grew up in Hollywood, California. As a child, she appeared in the 1939 film The Wizard of Oz as one of the munchkins. She had previously had a bit role in John Ford's 1937 film The Hurricane. Her work in television has won her three Emmys. In 2020, she published her autobiography, titled The Munchkin Diary: My Personal Yellow Brick Road.

Bruno has three sons, is married to Craig Scheiner and lives in California. She is a Stanford graduate and has been reported in media as one of the few surviving cast members from The Wizard of Oz.

References

External links

1930 births
Living people
American television reporters and correspondents
American television hosts
Stanford University alumni